The following outline is provided as an overview of and topical guide to Bihar:

Bihar – state in East India. It is the 13th largest state in India, with an area of 94,163 km2 (36,357 sq mi) and the 3rd largest by population; its population is the fastest-growing of any state.

General reference

Names 
 Common English country name(s): Bihar
 Pronunciation
 English 
 
 Official English country name(s): State of Bihar
 Nickname(s): 
 Adjectival(s): Bihari 
 Demonym(s): Biharis

Rankings (amongst India's states) 

 by population: 3rd
 by area (2011 census): 13th
 by crime rate (2015): 19th 
 by gross domestic product (GDP) (2014):  11th
by Human Development Index (HDI): 
by life expectancy at birth: 
by literacy rate:

Geography of Bihar 

Geography of Bihar
 Bihar is:  an Indian state
 Population of Bihar: 
 Area of Bihar:  
 Atlas of Bihar

Location of Bihar 
 Bihar is situated within the following regions:
 Northern Hemisphere
 Eastern Hemisphere
 Eurasia
 Asia
 South Asia
 Indian subcontinent
 India
 East India
 Time zone:  Indian Standard Time (UTC+05:30)

Environment of Bihar 
 Climate of Bihar
 Protected areas of Bihar
 Wildlife of Bihar
 Flora of Bihar
 Fauna of Bihar

Natural geographic features of Bihar 
 Islands of Bihar
 Lakes of Bihar
 Mountains of Bihar
 Volcanoes in Bihar
 Rivers of Bihar
 Waterfalls of Bihar
 Valleys of Bihar

Regions of Bihar 

Regions of Bihar
 North Bihar

Administrative divisions of Bihar 

 Divisions of Bihar
 Districts of Bihar
 Municipalities of Bihar

Divisions of Bihar 

Divisions of Bihar

Districts of Bihar 

Districts of Bihar

Municipalities of Bihar 

Municipalities of Bihar

 Capital of Bihar: Patna
 Cities of Bihar
 Villages of Bihar

Demography of Bihar 

Demographics of Bihar

Government and politics of Bihar 

Politics of Bihar
 Form of government: 
 Capital of Bihar: Capital of Bihar
 Political parties in Bihar
 List of politicians from Bihar

Elections in Bihar 

Elections in Bihar
 1952 Bihar Legislative Assembly election
 1962 Bihar Legislative Assembly election
 1985 Bihar Legislative Assembly election
 1990 Bihar Legislative Assembly election
 1995 Bihar Legislative Assembly election
 2000 Bihar Legislative Assembly election
 2005 Bihar Legislative Assembly election
 2010 Bihar Legislative Assembly election
 2015 Bihar Legislative Assembly election
 February 2005 Bihar Legislative Assembly election
 October 2005 Bihar Legislative Assembly election

Union government in Bihar 
 Rajya Sabha members from Bihar
 Bihar Pradesh Congress Committee
 Indian general election, 1971 (Bihar)
 Indian general election, 1977 (Bihar)
 Indian general election, 2004 (Bihar)
 Indian general election, 2009 (Bihar)
 Indian general election, 2014 (Bihar)

Branches of the government of Bihar 

Government of Bihar

Executive branch of the government of Bihar 
 Head of state: Governor of Bihar, 
 Head of government: Chief Minister of Bihar, 
 Cabinet of Bihar

Legislative branch of the government of Bihar 
 Bihar Legislature (bicameral)
 Upper house: Legislative Council of Bihar
 Lower house: Legislative Assembly of Bihar

Judicial branch of the government of Bihar 

 Patna High Court

Law and order in Bihar 

Law of Bihar
 Capital punishment in Bihar
 Crime in Bihar
 Organized crime in Bihar
 Law enforcement in Bihar
 Penal system of Bihar
 Bihar Police

History of Bihar 

History of Bihar

History of Bihar, by period 
 Timeline of Bihar

Prehistoric Bihar

Ancient Bihar 

 Anga
 Magadha
 Vaishali
 Haryanka dynasty
 Bimbisara
 Ajatashatru
 Rajgir
 Aryabhata
 Pataliputra
 Nanda Dynasty
 Maurya Empire
 Chandragupta Maurya
 Chanakya
 Arthashastra
 Bindusara
 Ashoka the Great
 Promotion of Buddhism
 Edicts of Ashoka
 Ashoka Chakra
 Lion Capital of Ashoka
 Sunga Empire
 Kanva dynasty
 Gupta Empire
 Chandragupta I
 Samudragupta
 Chandragupta II

Medieval Bihar

Colonial Bihar

Contemporary Bihar 

 2015 Bihar political crisis

History of Bihar, by region

History of Bihar, by subject 

 Earthquakes in Bihar
 1934 Nepal–Bihar earthquake
 Floods in Bihar
 1987 Bihar flood
 2004 Bihar flood
 2007 Bihar flood
 2008 Bihar flood
 2013 Bihar Flood
 Terrorist attacks in Bihar
 2008 attacks on Uttar Pradeshi and Bihari migrants in Maharashtra
 2013 Bihar Maoist attack

Culture of Bihar 

Culture of Bihar
 Architecture of Bihar
 Cuisine of Bihar
 Ethnic minorities in Bihar
 Festivals in Bihar
 Humor in Bihar
 Languages of Bihar
 Media in Bihar
 Prostitution in Bihar
 Public holidays in Bihar
 Records of Bihar
 World Heritage Sites in Bihar

The arts in Bihar 
 Art in Bihar
 Cinema of Bihar
 Literature of Bihar
 Music of Bihar
 Television in Bihar
 Theatre in Bihar

People of Bihar 

People of Bihar
 List of people from Bihar
 List of politicians from Bihar

Religion in Bihar 

Religion in Bihar
 Buddhism in Bihar
 Christianity in Bihar
 Hinduism in Bihar
 Islam in Bihar
 Judaism in Bihar
Jainism in Bihar

Sports in Bihar 

Sports in Bihar
 Cricket in Bihar
 Football in Bihar

Symbols of Bihar 

Symbols of Bihar
 State animal: Gaur
 State bird: House sparrow
 State flower: 
 State seal: Seal of Bihar
 State symbol:
 State tree:

Economy and infrastructure of Bihar 

Economy of Bihar
 Economic rank (by nominal GDP): 
 Agriculture in Bihar
 Banking in Bihar
 National Bank of Bihar
 Communications in Bihar
 Internet in Bihar
 Media in Bihar
 Companies of Bihar
 Currency of Bihar: 
 Economic history of Bihar
 Energy in Bihar
 Energy policy of Bihar
 Oil industry in Bihar
 Health care in Bihar
 Mining in Bihar
 Bihar Stock Exchange
 Tourism in Bihar
 Transport in Bihar
 Airports in Bihar
 Rail transport in Bihar
 Bukhtiarpur Bihar Light Railway
 Bihar Sampark Kranti Superfast Express
Patna Metro
 Roads in Bihar
 National Highways in Bihar
 State highways in Bihar
 State Highway 48 (Bihar)
 State Highway 49 (Bihar)
 State Highway 74 (Bihar)

Health and safety in Bihar 

  Water supply and sanitation in Bihar

Education in Bihar 

Education in Bihar
 List of museums in Bihar
 Literacy In Bihar
 List of institutions of higher education in Bihar
 Central University of South Bihar

See also 

 List of international rankings
 Outline of geography
 Adapur Bihar
 Administration in Bihar
 Ahe Dayamaya Biswa Bihari
 Arun Pathak (Bihari politician)
 Association of Bihar Cricket
 Atal Bihari Vajpayee
 Atal Bihari Vajpayee Hindi Vishwavidyalaya
 Atal Bihari Vajpayee Stadium
 Aurangabad (Bihar Lok Sabha constituency)
 Aurangabad district, Bihar
 Babasaheb Bhimrao Ambedkar Bihar University
 Banke Bihari Temple
 Bari Sangat Bihar
 Bayt al-Bihar
 Bengal Orissa Bihar Baptist Convention

 Bihar 996
 Bihar Agricultural University
 Bihar Colony
 Bihar Cricket Association
 Bihar Diwas
 Bihar Light Horse
 Bihar Mennonite Mandli
 Bihar Movement
 Bihar Museum
 Bihar National College

 Bihar Province
 Bihar Public Service Commission
 Bihar Regiment
 Bihar Reorganisation Act, 2000
 Bihar School Examination Board
 Bihar School of Yoga
 Bihar Sharif

 Bihar State Tourism Development Corporation
 Bihar Times
 Bihar Urban Infrastructure Development Corporation
 Bihar Vikas Party
 Bihar al-Anwar

 Bihar cricket team
 Bihar famine of 1873–74

 Bihari (disambiguation)
 Bihari Hindi
 Bihari Lal
 Bihari Mauritian
 Bihari Muslims
 Bihari brothers
 Bihari hindi
 Bihari languages
 Bihari literature
 
 Biharinath
 
 Biharipur
 Biharis
 Biharkeresztes
 Biharmonic Bézier surface
 Biharmonic equation
 Biharnagybajom
 Biharsharif (Vidhan Sabha constituency)
 Bihartorda
 Biharugra
 Biharwe
 Biharwe Division
 Biharwe F.C.
 Biman Bihari Das
 Binod Bihari Chowdhury
 Binod Bihari Verma
 Brahmapur, Bihar
 Bridges in Bihar
 Brij Bihari Chaubey
 Brij Bihari Pandey
 DD Bihar
 Digvijay Singh (Bihar)
 ETV Bihar
 Electoral history of Atal Bihari Vajpayee
 Ferenc Bihar
 Floods in Bihar
 Girish Bihari
 Gola Bazar, Bihar
 HMIS Bihar (J247)
 Hajdú-Bihar County
 Hindi in Bihar
 János Bihari
 József Bihari
 
 Kunj Bihari Lal Rathi
 Lal Bihari
 List of Chief Ministers of Bihar
 List of Deputy Chief Ministers of Bihar
 List of Finance Ministers of Bihar
 List of Governors of Bihar
 List of Governors of Bihar and Orissa
 List of Monuments of National Importance in Bihar
 List of State Protected Monuments in Bihar
 List of cities in Bihar by population
 List of constituencies of Bihar Legislative Assembly
 
 Malik clan (Bihar)
 Nalanda College Biharsharif
 Rajendra Nagar Bihar – Indore Express
 Pathans in Bihar
 Persecution of Biharis in Bangladesh
 Premiership of Atal Bihari Vajpayee
 Pulin Bihari Baske
 Pune Via Bihar
 Rahas Bihari Dwivedi
 Raj Bhavan (Bihar)
 Rajnagar Bihar
 S. H. Bihari
 Shaikh of Bihar
 Shita Coat Bihar, Nawabganj
 Shoshit Seva Sangh
 Shyam Bihari Misra
 State Mahadalit Commission, Bihar
 Sándor Bihari
 Uttar Bihar Gramin Bank

References

External links 

 
 
 Bihar State Trouism Development Corporation, Ltd. 

Bihar
Bihar
 
Bihar